The 2000 United States presidential primaries may refer to:

2000 Democratic Party presidential primaries
2000 Republican Party presidential primaries
2000 Reform Party presidential primaries